Linda Birgitta Sembrant (born 15 May 1987) is a Swedish professional footballer who plays as a centre back for Italian Serie A club Juventus FC and the Sweden women's national team.

Club career
Sembrant began playing football with SK Servia, then progressed through the youth system of Bälinge IF. Although her role model while growing up was the striker Henrik Larsson, Sembrant became a defender.

Sembrant spent the 2006–07 off–season playing in England with Lincoln Ladies (then known as Lincoln City Ladies). She then moved to AIK in 2008. In November 2010 Sembrant switched to Kopparbergs/Göteborg FC, after becoming captain of AIK. One year later she moved to Tyresö FF.

In 2012 Sembrant was part of the Tyresö team who won the Damallsvenskan championship, but she missed the end of the season after suffering an anterior cruciate ligament injury. Tyresö suffered a financial collapse during the 2014 season, withdrawing from the league and letting all their players go. Sembrant secured a lucrative move to French club Montpellier.

In July 2019, Sembrant moved to Italy to sign with defending Serie A champions Juventus.

International career
Sembrant represented Sweden at all youth levels, then won her first senior cap against England in February 2008. She was withdrawn from the Sweden squad for Euro 2009 through injury.

In 2011 Sembrant was called up to Sweden's squad for the World Cup in Germany. She retained her place in the national selection for the 2012 London Olympics.

On the occasion of Sembrant's 50th cap, she scored Sweden's goal in a 1–1 draw with Canada. The friendly match was staged in Los Angeles in November 2014.

Sembrandt scored against Thailand at the 2019 FIFA Women's World Cup, the opening goal in a 5–1 win.

International goals

Matches and goals scored at World Cup & Olympic tournaments

Matches and goals scored at European Championship tournaments

Honours
Kopparbergs/Göteborg FC
 Svenska Cupen: 2011

Tyresö FF
 Damallsvenskan: 2012

Juventus
 Serie A: 2019–20, 2020–21, 2021–22
 Supercoppa Italiana: 2019, 2020–21

Sweden 
 Summer Olympic Games Silver Medal: 2016

Personal life 
Sembrant lives together with Italian footballer Lisa Boattin in a same-sex relationship.

References

Match reports

External links

 
 
  (archive)
 
 National team profile 2008 at the Swedish Football Association
 Linda Sembrant at Goteborg 
  Linda Sembrant at Montpellier HSC 
 Linda Sembrant at statsfootofeminin.fr 
 

Living people
1987 births
Footballers from Uppsala
Swedish women's footballers
Sweden women's international footballers
Expatriate women's footballers in England
Notts County L.F.C. players
Expatriate women's footballers in France
2011 FIFA Women's World Cup players
Footballers at the 2012 Summer Olympics
2015 FIFA Women's World Cup players
Footballers at the 2016 Summer Olympics
FA Women's National League players
Olympic footballers of Sweden
Tyresö FF players
Damallsvenskan players
Juventus F.C. (women) players
BK Häcken FF players
Montpellier HSC (women) players
Bälinge IF players
Swedish expatriate women's footballers
Swedish expatriate sportspeople in France
Swedish expatriate sportspeople in England
Women's association football defenders
Medalists at the 2016 Summer Olympics
Olympic silver medalists for Sweden
Olympic medalists in football
Division 1 Féminine players
FIFA Century Club
2019 FIFA Women's World Cup players
Expatriate women's footballers in Italy
Serie A (women's football) players
Swedish expatriate sportspeople in Italy
UEFA Women's Euro 2022 players
Swedish LGBT sportspeople
LGBT association football players
Lesbian sportswomen
21st-century LGBT people
UEFA Women's Euro 2017 players